The 2019 Houston Dynamo season is the club's 14th season of existence since joining Major League Soccer in the 2006 season. The Dynamo missed the playoffs in 2018, but they did win the 2018 US Open Cup, the first in club history. The Open Cup victory also qualified the Dynamo for the 2019 CONCACAF Champions League. It is the Dynamo's third year with Wilmer Cabrera as Head coach and fifth season under General Manager Matt Jordan. On the front office end, it is Gabriel Brener's fourth season as majority owner. On November 1, 2018, John Walker was announced as the new President of Business Operations, replacing Chris Canetti who stepped down on October 26.  On July 18, NBA and Houston Rockets All-Star James Harden became a minority owner in the Dynamo

The Dynamo got off to their best start in club history, winning 6 and drawing 1 in their first 8 league matches.  However, Houston would lose form as the season progressed. The Dynamo were knocked out of the Champions League in the quarter finals to Tigres and fell to Minnesota United at home in the Round of 16 for the US Open Cup, After a 14 game stretch that saw the Dynamo only get 2 wins and 1 draw that included 4-0 and 5-0 defeats to the Portland Timbers and Atlanta United respectively, the Dynamo had fallen down to 9th place in the Western Conference.  On August 13, Cabrera was fired as head coach. Assistant coach Davy Arnaud was promoted to interim head coach. Arnaud and the newly acquired Christian Ramirez were able to improve the Dynamo's performances at the end of the season, but not enough to lead them into the playoffs. Houston missed the playoffs for the 5th time in 6 years and team captain DaMarcus Beasley retired at the end of the season.

Current squad 

Appearances and goals are totals for MLS regular season only. Age and stats are up to the end of the season.

Player movement

In 
Per Major League Soccer and club policies terms of the deals do not get disclosed.

Out

MLS SuperDraft

Coaching staff

Non-competitive

Preseason friendlies

Midseason friendlies 
TBD

Competitive

MLS

Standings

Western Conference table

Overall table

Match results

U.S. Open Cup 

As a member of MLS, the Dynamo will enter the competition at the fourth round, scheduled to be played on June 11, 2019.

CONCACAF Champions League

Round of 16

Quarter-finals

Leagues Cup

Player Statistics

Appearances, goals, and assists 
{| class="wikitable sortable" style="text-align:center;"
|+
! rowspan="2" |No.
! rowspan="2" |Pos
! rowspan="2" |Nat
! rowspan="2" |
! colspan="3" |
! colspan="3" |
! colspan="3" |
! colspan="3" |
! colspan="3" |
|-
!
!
!
!
!
!
!
!
!
!
!
!
!
!
!
|-
|1||GK||||align=left|||9||0||0||7||0||0||1||0||0||0||0||0||1||0||0
|-
|2||DF||||align=left|||12||0||1||8||0||1||2||0||1||1||0||0||1||0||0
|-
|3||DF||||align=left|||29||0||4||28||0||4||0||0||0||1||0||0||0||0||0
|-
|5||MF||||align=left|||19||1||0||15||1||0||2||0||0||1||0||0||1||0||0
|-
|6||DF||||align=left|||32||0||1||29||0||1||0||0||0||3||0||0||0||0||0
|-
|7||DF||||align=left|||18||2||2||12||0||2||1||0||0||4||1||0||1||1||0
|-
|8||MF||||align=left|||28||7||5||26||7||5||0||0||0||1||0||0||1||0||0
|-
|9||FW||||align=left|||36||15||8||32||13||8||0||0||0||4||2||0||0||0||0
|-
|10||MF||||align=left|||37||7||4||33||5||3||2||2||1||2||0||0||0||0||0
|-
|11||MF||||align=left|||39||2||3||33||2||3||2||0||0||4||0||0||0||0||0
|-
|12||FW||||align=left|||4||0||0||4||0||0||0||0||0||0||0||0||0||0||0
|-
|12||DF||||align=left|||4||0||0||1||0||0||2||0||0||0||0||0||1||0||0
|-
|13||FW||||align=left|||10||5||1||10||5||1||0||0||0||0||0||0||0||0||0
|-
|14||MF||||align=left|||18||0||1||12||0||0||2||0||1||3||0||0||1||0||0
|-
|15||DF||||align=left|||29||0||3||25||0||3||0||0||0||4||0||0||0||0||0
|-
|16||DF||||align=left|||16||0||1||12||0||1||2||0||0||1||0||0||1||0||1
|-
|17||FW||||align=left|||31||9||11||26||9||10||0||0||0||4||0||1||1||0||0
|-
|18||DF||||align=left|||5||0||1||5||0||1||0||0||0||0||0||0||0||0||0
|-
|19||FW||||align=left|||10||0||0||7||0||0||2||0||0||0||0||0||1||0||0
|-
|20||DF||||align=left|||27||0||1||23||0||1||0||0||0||4||0||0||0||0||0
|-
|21||FW||||align=left|||8||2||1||4||0||0||2||2||1||2||0||0||0||0||0
|-
|22||MF||||align=left|||36||1||1||30||0||1||2||1||0||4||0||0||0||0||0
|-
|23||GK||||align=left|||31||0||0||27||0||0||0||0||0||4||0||0||0||0||0
|-
|24||MF||||align=left|||16||1||0||13||1||0||0||0||0||2||0||0||1||0||0
|-
|25||MF||||align=left|||2||0||0||0||0||0||1||0||0||0||0||0||1||0||0
|-
|26||GK||||align=left|||1||0||0||0||0||0||1||0||0||0||0||0||0||0||0
|-
|27||MF||||align=left|||37||0||1||32||0||1||2||0||0||3||0||0||0||0||0
|-
|28||DF||||align=left|||0||0||0||0||0||0||0||0||0||0||0||0||0||0||0
|-
|29||DF||||align=left|||2||0||0||0||0||0||1||0||0||0||0||0||1||0||0
|-
|31||MF||||align=left|||23||2||2||18||2||2||0||0||0||4||0||0||1||0||0
|-
|34||FW||||align=left|||1||0||0||0||0||0||1||0||0||0||0||0||0||0||0

Disciplinary record 
{| class="wikitable sortable" style="text-align:center;"
|+
! rowspan="2" |No.
! rowspan="2" |Pos
! rowspan="2" |Nat
! rowspan="2" |Player
! colspan="2" |Total
! colspan="2" |MLS
! colspan="2" |US Open Cup
! colspan="2" |
! colspan="2" |
|-
!style="width:30px;"|
!style="width:30px;"|
!style="width:30px;"|
!style="width:30px;"|
!style="width:30px;"|
!style="width:30px;"|
!style="width:30px;"|
!style="width:30px;"|
!style="width:30px;"|
!style="width:30px;"|
|-
|1||GK||||align=left|||0||0||0||0||0||0||0||0||0||0
|-
|2||DF||||align=left|||5||0||3||0||1||0||0||0||1||0
|-
|3||DF||||align=left|||4||0||4||0||0||0||0||0||0||0
|-
|5||MF||||align=left|||5||0||4||0||1||0||0||0||0||0
|-
|6||DF||||align=left|||5||0||4||0||0||0||1||0||0||0
|-
|7||DF||||align=left|||0||0||0||0||0||0||0||0||0||0
|-
|8||MF||||align=left|||3||0||3||0||0||0||0||0||0||0
|-
|9||FW||||align=left|||0||0||0||0||0||0||0||0||0||0
|-
|10||MF||||align=left|||2||0||2||0||0||0||0||0||0||0
|-
|11||MF||||align=left|||3||0||3||0||0||0||0||0||0||0
|-
|12||FW||||align=left|||0||0||0||0||0||0||0||0||0||0
|-
|12||DF||||align=left|||1||0||0||0||1||0||0||0||0||0
|-
|13||FW||||align=left|||0||0||0||0||0||0||0||0||0||0
|-
|14||MF||||align=left|||0||0||0||0||0||0||0||0||0||0
|-
|15||DF||||align=left|||7||1||6||1||0||0||1||0||0||0
|-
|16||DF||||align=left|||1||0||1||0||0||0||0||0||0||0
|-
|17||FW||||align=left|||7||1||6||1||0||0||1||0||0||0
|-
|18||DF||||align=left|||1||0||1||0||0||0||0||0||0||0
|-
|19||FW||||align=left|||1||0||0||0||0||0||0||0||1||0
|-
|20||DF||||align=left|||6||0||6||0||0||0||0||0||0||0
|-
|21||FW||||align=left|||4||0||3||0||0||0||1||0||0||0
|-
|22||MF||||align=left|||11||1||9||1||0||0||2||0||0||0
|-
|23||GK||||align=left|||0||0||0||0||0||0||0||0||0||0
|-
|24||MF||||align=left|||1||0||1||0||0||0||0||0||0||0
|-
|25||MF||||align=left|||0||0||0||0||0||0||0||0||0||0
|-
|26||GK||||align=left|||0||0||0||0||0||0||0||0||0||0
|-
|27||MF||||align=left|||8||0||6||0||1||0||1||0||0||0
|-
|28||DF||||align=left|||0||0||0||0||0||0||0||0||0||0
|-
|29||DF||||align=left|||0||0||0||0||0||0||0||0||0||0
|-
|31||MF||||align=left|||5||1||5||1||0||0||0||0||0||0
|-
|34||FW||||align=left|||0||0||0||0||0||0||0||0||0||0

References 

2019
2019 in sports in Texas
American soccer clubs 2019 season
2019 Major League Soccer season
2019 CONCACAF Champions League participants seasons